The appendix of the epididymis (or pedunculated hydatid) is a small stalked appendage (sometimes duplicated) on the head of the epididymis. It is usually regarded as a detached efferent duct.

This structure is derived from the Wolffian duct (Mesonephric Duct) as opposed to the appendix testis which is derived from the Müllerian duct (Paramesonephric Duct) remnant.

See also
 Appendix testis

References

External links
  - Torsion of Appendix Epididymis
 
 

Mammal male reproductive system